is a district located in Kumamoto Prefecture, Japan.

As of 2003, the district has an estimated population of 27,264 and a density of 101.94 persons per square kilometer. The total area is 267.45 km2.

Towns and villages
Ashikita
Tsunagi

Merger
On January 1, 2005, the town of Tanoura merged into the expanded town of Ashikita.

Districts in Kumamoto Prefecture